Edward Lytton Wheeler (1854/5 – 1885) was a nineteenth century American writer of dime novels. One of his most famous characters is the Wild West rascal Deadwood Dick. His stories of the west mixed fictional characters with real-life personalities of the era, including Calamity Jane and Sitting Bull.

Life

Wheeler was born in Avoca, New York and later managed a theater company in Philadelphia. He created the seminal character of Deadwood Dick, during a period when the country was fascinated by the Black Hills region of the American west after Custer’s defeat at Little Bighorn. Wheeler had never been to the Black Hills. He originally created Deadwood Dick as a character for his theater troupe, and later made him the focus of a dime novel series. The first episode was the first issue of Beadles Half-dime Library.

After the Civil War, dime novels were an extremely popular form of fiction. Wheeler mastered their formulaic style and was able to write dozens of them. He created around one hundred novels, of which 33 featured Deadwood Dick, and of these, Calamity Jane—a real-life wild west entertainer—appeared as a character in nearly half. Other real life people such as Sitting Bull also appeared in the stories. He also wrote story series with a number of other characters including Rosebud Bob, Sierra Sam, Kangaroo Kit, Yreka Jim, Denver Doll, and Lady Kate.

References

External links

 

1854 births
1885 deaths
American male novelists
American Western (genre) novelists
People from Steuben County, New York
Dime novelists
Novelists from New York (state)